Flybys is the second full-length album by California pop music band The Curtains, released in 2003 on the independent, Los Angeles-based Thin Wrist label. Personnel on this record includes Chris Cohen and Greg Saunier, both members of the band Deerhoof.

Track listing
 Park Work
 The Burl
 Computer Finch
 Bummer with Cakes
 Time Center
 Watch for: The Eliminator
 Fast Talks
 Blink, Professor
 Asterisks by Moonlight
 Hatching the New Guy
 Partners
 Death Constellation
 Binotic Ting
 Moment with Plankton
 Telegraph Victories
 Saga
 Observations
 Pure Bronze
 The Shooter
 Alpine Hunter
 It's the Bunklords
 Snowy Visitors

Personnel

 Chris Cohen – guitar, keyboards
 Andrew Maxwell - vocals, drums 
 Greg Saunier - keyboards
 Trevor Shimizu - keyboards
 Jamie Peterson - electronics

References

2003 albums
The Curtains albums